Inclusionary zoning (IZ), also known as inclusionary housing, refers to municipal and county planning ordinances that require a given share of new construction to be affordable by people with low to moderate incomes. The term inclusionary zoning indicates that these ordinances seek to counter exclusionary zoning practices, which aim to exclude low-cost housing from a municipality through the zoning code. There are variations among different inclusionary zoning programs.  Firstly, they can be mandatory or voluntary. Though voluntary programs exist, the great majority has been built as a result of local mandatory programmes requiring developers to include the affordable units in their developments.  There are also variations among the set-aside requirements, affordability levels coupled with the period of control. In order to encourage engagements in these zoning programs, developers are awarded with incentives for engaging in these programs, such as density bonus, expedited approval and fee waivers.

In practice, these policies involve placing deed restrictions on 10–30% of new houses or apartments in order to make the cost of the housing affordable to lower-income households. The mix of "affordable housing" and "market-rate" housing in the same neighborhood is seen as beneficial by city planners and sociologists. Inclusionary zoning is a tool for local municipalities in the United States to allegedly help provide a wider range of housing options than a free market provides on its own. Many economists consider the program as a price control on a percentage of units, which negatively impacts the supply of housing.

Most inclusionary zoning is enacted at the municipal or county level; when imposed by the state, as in Massachusetts, it has been argued that such laws usurp local control. In such cases, developers can use inclusionary zoning to avoid certain aspects of local zoning laws.

Historical background 
During the mid- to late-20th century, new suburbs grew and expanded around American cities as middle-class house buyers, supported by federal loan programs such as Veterans Administration housing loan guarantees, left established neighborhoods and communities. These newly populated places were generally more economically homogeneous than the cities they encircled. Many suburban communities enacted local ordinances, often in zoning codes, to preserve the character of their municipality. One of the most commonly cited exclusionary practices is the stipulation that lots must be of a certain minimum size and houses must be set back from the street a certain minimum distance. In many cases, these housing ordinances prevented affordable housing from being built, because the large plots of land required to build within the code restrictions were cost-prohibitive for modestly priced houses. Communities have remained accessible to wealthier citizens because of these ordinances, effectively shutting the low income families out of desirable communities. Such zoning ordinances have not always been enacted with conscious intent to exclude lower income households, but it has been the unintended result of such policies.

By denying lower income families access to suburban communities, many feel that exclusionary zoning has contributed to the maintenance of inner city ghettos. Supporters of inclusionary zoning point out that low income households are more likely to become economically successful if they have middle class neighbors as peers and role models. When effective, inclusionary zoning reduces the concentration of poverty in slum districts where social norms may not provide adequate models of success. Education is one of the largest components in the effort to lift people out of poverty; access to high-quality  public schools is another key benefit of reduced segregation. Statistically, a poor child in a school where 80% of the children are poor scores 13–15% lower compared to environments where the poor child's peers are 80% middle class.

In many of the communities where inclusionary zoning has been put into practice, income requirements allow households that earn 80–120% of the median income to qualify for the "affordable" housing. This is because in many places high housing prices have prevented even median-income households from buying market-rate properties. This is especially prominent in California, where only 16% of the population could afford the median-priced home during 2005.

Potential benefits and limitations of IZ Policies

Potential benefits 
 Poor and working families would have access to a range of opportunities, including good employment opportunities, good schools, comprehensive transportation system and safe streets 
 Alleviating the problem of inadequate supply of Affordable Housing 
 Avoiding economic and racial segregation, which helps reducing crime rate, failing schools and improving social stability
 Relatively small amount of public subsidies required for adopting IZ as a market-based tool

Potential limitations 
 Low production of affordable housings, which produced approximately 150,000 units over several decades nationwide, comparing to other schemes, such as Housing Choice Vouchers that helps approximately two million households and the LIHTC program that has produced over two million affordable homes
 Unstable production of affordable housing that highly affected by local housing-market conditions

Differences in ordinances 
Inclusionary zoning ordinances vary substantially among municipalities. These variables can include:

 Mandatory or voluntary ordinance. While many cities require inclusionary housing, many more offer zoning bonuses, expedited permits, reduced fees, cash subsidies, or other incentives for developers who voluntarily build affordable housing.
 Percentage of units to be dedicated as inclusionary housing. This varies quite substantially among jurisdictions, but appears to range from 10–30%.
 Minimum size of development that the ordinance applies to. Most jurisdictions exempt smaller developments, but some require that even developments incurring only a fraction of an inclusionary housing unit pay a fee (see below).
 Whether inclusionary housing must be built on site. Some programs allow housing to be built nearby, in cases of hardship.
 Whether fees can be paid in lieu of building inclusionary housing. Fees-in-lieu allow a developer to "buy out" of an inclusionary housing obligation. This may seem to defeat the purpose of inclusionary zoning, but in some cases the cost of building one affordable unit on-site could purchase several affordable units off-site.
 Income level or price defined as "affordable," and buyer qualification methods. Most ordinances seem to target inclusionary units to low- or moderate-income households which earn approximately the regional median income or somewhat below. Inclusionary housing typically does not create housing for those with very low incomes.
Whether inclusionary housing units are limited by price or by size (the City of Johanneburg  for example provides for both options)
 Appearance and integration of inclusionary housing units. Many jurisdictions require that inclusionary housing units be indistinguishable from market-rate units, but this can increase costs.
 Longevity of price restrictions attached to inclusionary housing units, and allowable appreciation. Ordinances that allow the "discount" to expire essentially grant a windfall profit to the inclusionary housing buyer, preventing that subsidy from being recycled to other needy households. On the other hand, preventing price appreciation removes a key incentive for home ownership. Many programs restrict annual price appreciation (by, for instance, enrolling inclusionary housing in community land trusts), often tying it to inflation plus market value of home improvements, striving to balance the community's interest in long-term affordability with the homeowner's interest in accruing equity over time.
 Whether housing rehabilitation counts as "construction," either of market-rate or affordable units. Some cities, like New York City, allow developers to count rehabilitation of off-site housing as an inclusionary contribution.
 Which types of housing construction the ordinance applies to. For example, high-rise housing costs more to build per square foot (thus raising compliance costs, perhaps prohibitively), so some ordinances exempt it from compliance.

Alternative solutions 
While many suburban communities feature Section 8 for low income households, they are generally restricted to concentrated sections. In some cases, counties specify small districts where Section 8 properties are to be rented. In other cases, the market tends to self-segregate property by income. For instance, in Montgomery County, Pennsylvania, a wealthy suburban county bordering Philadelphia, only 5% of the county's population live in the borough of Norristown, yet 50% of the county's Section 8 properties are located there. The large low income resident population burdens Norristown's local government and school district, while much of the county remains unburdened.

Inclusionary zoning aims to reduce residential economic segregation by mandating that a mix of incomes be represented in a single development.

Controversy 
Inclusionary zoning remains a controversial issue.  Some affordable housing advocates seek to promote the policies in order to ensure that housing is available for a variety of income levels in more places.  These supporters hold that inclusionary zoning produces  needed affordable housing and creates income-integrated communities.

Yet other Affordable Housing advocates state the reverse is true, that Inclusionary Zoning can have the opposite effect and actually reduce affordable housing in a community. For example, in Los Angeles, California, inclusionary zoning apparently accelerated gentrification, as older, unprofitable buildings were razed and replaced with mostly high-rent housing, and a small percentage of affordable housing; the net result was less affordable housing. In New York, NY, inclusionary zoning allows for up to a 400% increase in luxury housing for every unit of affordable housing and for an additional 400% luxury housing when combined with the liberal use of development rights. Critics have stated the affordable housing can be directed to those making up to $200,000 through the improper use of an Area Median Income, and used as political tools by organizations tied to various politicians. New York City communities such as Harlem, the Lower East Side, Williamsburg, Chelsea and Hell's Kitchen have experienced significant secondary displacement through the use of Inclusionary Zoning.

Real Estate industry detractors note that inclusionary zoning levies an indirect tax on developers, so as to discourage them from building in areas that face supply shortages.  Furthermore, to ensure that the affordable units are not resold for profit, deed restrictions generally fix a long-term resale price ceiling, eliminating a potential benefit of home ownership.

Free market advocates oppose attempts to fix given social outcomes by government intervention in markets.  They argue inclusionary zoning constitutes an onerous land use regulation that exacerbates housing shortages.

Homeowners sometimes note that their property values will be reduced if low income families move into their community. Others counter consider their concerns thinly-concealed classism and racism.

Some of the most widely publicized inclusionary zoning battles have involved the REIT AvalonBay Communities.  According to the company's website, AvalonBay seeks to develop properties in "high barrier-to-entry markets" across the United States.  In practice, AvalonBay uses inclusionary zoning laws, such as the Massachusetts Comprehensive Permit Act: Chapter 40B, to bypass local zoning laws and build large apartment complexes.  In some cases, local residents fight back with a lawsuit.  In Connecticut, similar developments by AvalonBay have resulted in attempts to condemn the land or reclaim it by eminent domain.  In most cases AvalonBay has won these disputes and built extremely profitable apartments or condominiums.

Other legal battles have occurred in California, where many cities have implemented inclusionary zoning policies that typically require 10 percent to 15 percent of units to be affordable housing. The definition of affordable housing includes both low-income housing and moderate-income housing. In California, low-income housing is typically designed for households making 51 percent to 80 percent of the median income, and moderate-income housing is typically for households making 81 percent to 120 percent of the median income. Developers have attempted to fight back these requirements by challenging local inclusionary zoning ordinances through the court legal system. In the case Home Builders Association of Northern California v. City of Napa, the California First District Court of Appeal upheld the inclusionary zoning ordinances of City of Napa that require 10 percent of units of the new development project to be moderate income housing against the Home Builders Association that challenged the City of Napa. Cities have also attempted to impose inclusionary requirements on rental units. However, the Costa-Hawkins Rental Housing Act prohibits cities in California from imposing limitation on rental rates on vacant units. Subsequently, developers have won cases, such as Palmer/Sixth Street Properties, L.P. v. City of Los Angeles (2009), against cities that imposed inclusionary requirements on rental units, as the state law supersedes local ordinances.

Citizen groups and developers have also sought other ways to strengthen or defeat inclusionary zoning laws. For example, the initiative and referendum process in California allows citizen groups or developers to change local ordinances on affordable housing by popular vote. Any citizens or interest groups can participate in this process by gathering at least the required number of signatures so that the measure proposed can qualify to be on the ballot; once enough signatures are submitted and the ballot measure is cleared by election officials, the ballot measure is typically placed on the ballot for the upcoming election. One recent case is Proposition C in San Francisco. This ballot measure was placed on the ballot for the June 2016 California primary election. Passed in June 2016, this proposition amends the City's Charter to increase the requirement for affordable housing for development projects of 25 units or more.

The clash between these various interests is reflected in this study published by the libertarian-leaning Reason Foundation's public policy think tank, and the response of a
peer review of that research. Local governments reflect and in some cases balance these competing interests. In California, the League of Cities has created a guide to inclusionary zoning which includes a section on the pros and cons of the policies.

Failure in improving social integration coupled with increasing social cost 
It is suggested that IZ policies may not effectively disperse low-income units throughout the region, which actually contradicts the aim of the policy itself. For instances in Suffolk County, it is found that there is a spatial concentration of IZ units in poor neighbourhood coupled with higher proportions of Black and Hispanic, which are considered the minorities. Furthermore, 97.7% of the IZ units were built in only 10% of the census tract from 1980 to 2000, which is area with the lowest-income neighbourhood coupled with clustering of minorities. It is indispensable to notice that housing policies is controlled by local government rather than regional government in Suffolk County, therefore without regional coordinations of housing policy, it fails to consider the inter-municipality distribution of low-income household within the county. Besides, density bonuses given to property developers for the provision of IZ units have intensified the concentration of affordable units in poor neighborhood (Ryan & Enderle as cited in Mukhija, Das, Regus et al., 2012). This shows that IZ policies may fail to disperse the low-income distributions when it is carried out without taking regional coordination into account.

Moreover, with density bonuses allocated to property developers for the provision of IZ units, it implies the community would be bearing the cost of increasing population density and sharing existing infrastructure.

In practice

Examples from the USA 
More than 200 communities in the United States have some sort of inclusionary zoning provision.

Montgomery County, Maryland, is often held to be a pioneer in establishing inclusionary zoning policies. It is the sixth wealthiest county in the United States, yet it has built more than 10,000 units of affordable housing since 1974, many units door-to-door with market-rate housing.

All municipalities in the state of Massachusetts are subject to that state's General Laws Chapter 40B, which allows developers to bypass certain municipal zoning restrictions in those municipalities which have fewer than the statutorily defined 10% affordable housing units. Developers taking advantage of Chapter 40B must construct 20% affordable units as defined under the statute.

All municipalities in the state of New Jersey are subject to judicially imposed inclusionary zoning as a result of the New Jersey Supreme Court's Mount Laurel Decision and subsequent acts of the New Jersey state legislature.

A 2006 study, found that 170 jurisdictions in California had some form of inclusionary housing.  This was a 59% increase from 2003, when only 107 jurisdictions had inclusionary housing.  In addition, state law requires that 15% of the housing units produced in redevelopment project areas must be affordable. At least 20% of revenue generated from a redevelopment project must be contributed to low-income and moderate-income housing. However, Governor Jerry Brown passed AB 1X 26 that dissolved all redevelopment agencies on February 1, 2012.

However, Los Angeles, California's inclusionary zoning ordinance for rental housing was invalidated in 2009 by the California Court of Appeal for the Second Appellate District because it directly conflicted with a provision of the state's Costa-Hawkins Rental Housing Act of 1996 which specifically gave all landlords the right to set the "initial rental rate" for new housing units.

Madison, Wisconsin's inclusionary zoning ordinance respecting rental housing was struck down by Wisconsin's 4th District Court of Appeals in 2006 because that appellate court construed inclusionary zoning to be rent control, which is prohibited by state statute.  The Wisconsin Supreme Court declined the City's request to review the case. The ordinance was structured with a sunset in February 2009, unless extended by the Common Council.  The Common Council did not extend the inclusionary zoning ordinance and therefore it expired and is no longer in effect.

International Examples

Johannesburg, South Africa 
On 21 Feb 2019, the City of Johannesburg Council approved its "Inclusionary Housing Incentives, Regulations and Mechanisms 2019". The policy is the first of its kind in South Africa and provides four options for inclusionary housing (including price limited, size limited or negotiated options) where at least 30% of dwelling units in new developments of 20 units or more, must be inclusionary housing.

The trend of going mandatory over voluntary 
While inclusionary zoning can be either mandatory or voluntary, some studies have shown that mandatory approaches would be crucial to the success of inclusionary zoning programs in terms of providing a larger number of affordable housing. Below are some examples showing the greater effect of mandatory practice over voluntary practice:

See also 
 Visitability - Social Integration Beyond Independent Living
 Affordable housing
 Residential segregation
 Exclusionary zoning
 Office of Fair Housing and Equal Opportunity
 Woodward's building

Notes

References 
 Business and Professional People for the Public Interest Issue Brief #4 Inclusionary Housing in Montgomery County, MD,
 Rusk, David; Nine Lessons for Inclusionary Zoning, National Inclusionary Housing Conference
 Waring, Tom; "Section 8 needs a dose of reform, Hoeffel says" Northeast Times, May 15, 2002
 Inclusionary Housing for the City of Chicago: Facts and Myths, North Park University

Affordable housing
Price controls
Zoning